Egschiglen are a Mongolian folk band, formed in Ulan Bator in 1991. In English, Egschiglen means "Beautiful Melody", and they are one of very few traditional Mongolian bands to have become internationally popular.

From the beginning, Egschiglen set the focus of their artistic work on contemporary music. They systematically explored the sound dimensions of works by classical-modernist Mongolian composers, using traditional instruments from Mongolia and Central Asia, including the morin khuur (a violin with two strings made of horse hair), tobshuur (a lute symbolizing a swan's throat as neck), joochin (a type of hammered dulcimer), bass, percussion and singing techniques like khöömii throat singing.

Their music is characterized by the delicacy and transparency of chamber music, but also by its deeply natural, compelling force. In Egschiglen’s performances, tunes from Shamanist or Buddhist tradition, which are common in Central Asia, impress through their diversity of expression and their intricate arrangements.

The musicians also experiment with balancing acts between diverse cultures: in the course of the years, Egschiglen participated in a number of cooperation projects with musicians from various cultural areas. Furthermore, in a relaxed attitude, they present the latest finds from their adopted home, Franconia: traditional song material from the Altmühl valley, arranged as a Mongolian khöömii / morin khuur crossover, which the band has released on their recent album Gereg.

Members of the band are: Tumenbayar Migdorj, Tumursaihan Yanlav, Uuganbaatar Tsend-Ochir, Amartuwshin Baasandorj, Sarangerel Tserevsamba, who are accompanied for live concerts by the female dancer Ariuanaa Tserendavaa.

Discography
 Traditionelle Mongolische Lieder (1995)
 Gobi (1997)
 Zazal (2000, Grenzland Studio, Bocholt)
 Sounds of Mongolia (2001)
 Gereg (2007)

External links
 
 Official website Egschiglen
 Egschiglen at El Espiritu del Sur
 BBC Review of Gereg
 The Guardian Review of Gereg

Throat singing
Ulaanbaatar
Mongolian traditional music groups